Trombidium grandissimum, commonly known as the giant red velvet mite, is a species of mite in the genus Trombidium in the family Trombidiidae. The mite is endemic to northern and central India, where it is called 'Badal kida', 'Bhir-buti', 'Birbhoti' or 'Bir Bahoit'. T. grandissimum is normally seen during the rainy season or after recent rain events, and therefore has the nickname of "rain bug".

Description 
Trombidium grandissimum has a soft cushioning skin covered with bright red coloured hairs. These insects are terrestrial and live in soil burrows. They are found in dry, arid, desiccating regions. These mites are predatory in nature and feed on termites and eggs of insects, like ants. They share many similarities with the order Araneae. The insect is used therapeutically in the treatment of paralysis and sexual dysfunction.

The mites are a bright red colour attributed to the pigment carotene. A study on the spider mite Tetranychus urticae shows that carotene is beneficial for their hibernation. T. grandissimum, belonging to the same order as spider mites, spend an extensive period of time in hibernation under the soil. This might be the reason why they also depend on red pigmentation by which their haemolymph is usually coloured.

Microscopy 
The mites were observed under stereo microscope for the detailed classification and analysis of different parts of their body, and structural samples were processed using ESEM and FESEM.

The FESEM images of the front leg sensilla hairs and claws at the tip usually measured around 500μm. Stalked eyes pointed with white arrows measured around 1mm. White arrows magnified by ESEM were measured around 400μm. The red velvet skin is shown to be covered by sensitive hairs. The whole body hairs showing the branches and arrangement measured around 50μm in size.

Behavior 
Trombidium grandissimum were found to be sensitive towards light and they become activated when light was focused on them. 

In their natural habitat they were found to move on horizontal plane. They seemed to be reluctant to climb up against the gravitational force which may be due to their bulky body size and shorter legs. They can easily wriggle their bodies through small openings and thus can easily get inside the burrows of ants and other insects to feed on their eggs. Males and females of Trombidiidae mites perform encircling dances, after which they pair for mating. A dead mite was found to be surrounded by ants suggesting that they are non-toxic to other species and their cannibalistic nature suggests the same.

References 

Trombidiidae
Endemic fauna of India
Animals described in 1867